Boarding School is a 2018 American horror film written and directed by Boaz Yakin and starring  Luke Prael, Sterling Jerins, and Will Patton. The plot is about a boy who is sent to a remote boarding school and discovers something sinister occurring there. The film was first released in the US on August 31, 2018.

Plot 
Jacob Rathbone is a 12-year-old boy with a fear of the dark who lives with his stepfather, Davis and his mother, Isabel, who is frustrated with her son’s frequent night terrors. After being discovered dancing while dressed in his late grandmother’s dress and being suspended from his school (after being bullied for his obsession with his late grandmother), Jacob is sent away to a boarding school in the wilderness governed by the eccentric couple, Dr. and Mrs. Sherman. He meets his classmates: twins Lenny and Calvin, and social outcasts like disfigured burn survivor Phil, Tourette's sufferer Frederic, autistic Elwood Ramsay, and manipulative Christine Holcomb, the daughter of Davis’ boss, Mr. Holcomb (whom Jacob met on one evening when he and his parents had dinner with her family). Their classes are administered under Dr. Sherman’s strict regime that consists of a Bible Studies curriculum and corporal punishments.

Not long after, Frederic is discovered dead half-naked in the bathroom in apparent suicide by hanging. Christine uses this opportunity to flee the school with Jacob, only to be caught and brought back. Dr. Sherman reveals that Christine was sent there as a result of having murdered her older brother, Timothy, and driving her mother to commit suicide over the tragedy. Christine lures Jacob to her room, where she confesses to talking Frederic into trying out autoerotic asphyxiation and pushing him to death to divert everybody’s attention so she could escape. She blackmails Jacob into dancing with her, during which she attempts to stab him with a pair of scissors but is overpowered by him. In a display of her masochistic tendencies, she professes her love for him and claims she wanted to provoke Jacob into beating her up.

Jacob later finds Elwood dead in bed. An argument between Dr. and Mrs. Sherman — whose real identity is Lynn Adams — reveals that it was she who had murdered Elwood, and that the children will all die that night. He finds the bodies of the real Dr. and Mrs. Sherman and Frederic stashed in the freezer in the basement. A conversation between Mrs. Ramsay and Dr. Sherman suggests a prior arrangement where, being unable to cope with Elwood’s condition, Mrs. Ramsay had sent him there to be killed off seemingly in an accident — a fate that awaits all the other children. Ms. Adams stabs Mrs. Ramsay to death; Dr. Sherman slits Ms. Adams’ throat and kills the groundskeeper.

Dr. Sherman reveals to Jacob that he has been contract killing since he was around Jacob’s age, and his plan is to have everyone in the house killed in a fire. Jacob also finds out that it was his stepfather, Davis, who had him sent there to rid himself and Isabel of him. Jacob manages to  bludgeon Dr. Sherman to death and set him on fire.

He evacuates everyone from the house except Christine, whom he leaves for dead as a way of avenging Frederic's death. Having declared his love for Christine, Jacob peels off his dress, showing his true, naked self to his friends for the first time. Now rescued, the children reunite with their parents, as Jacob whispers to Phil's father that he knows of his intention, and promises to make him regret it if anything happens to Phil.

Throughout the film, the audience is shown flashbacks where, being forced into hiding during World War II, Jacob's grandmother Feiga, a recluse, sharpened her teeth with a nail file, while her compatriot, Tsipi was frequently raped and tortured by a Nazi soldier in exchange for her life. Back at home, having finally overcome his fear of the dark, Jacob waits as Isabel’s terrified screams are heard from the dinner table. Davis dies from ingesting poisoned wine (tainted by the same poison Dr. Sherman used to attempt to kill Mrs. Ramsay). Jacob taints his lips red with blood, mirroring Feiga ripping out the Nazi’s throat with her fangs; suggesting that just like Feiga, hardships have made him a fighter albeit a monster.

Cast 
 Luke Prael as Jacob Rathbone
 Nadia Alexander as Phil
 Sterling Jerins as Christine Holcomb
 Nicholas J. Oliveri as Elwood Ramsay
 Christopher Dylan White as Frederic
 Will Patton as Dr. Sherman
 Tammy Blanchard as Mrs. Sherman/Lynn Adams
 Samantha Mathis as Isabel
 Robert John Burke as Mr. Holcomb
 Kobi George as Lenny
 Kadin George as Calvin
 Barbara Kingsley as Elderly Tsipi
 Allison Winn as Yong Tsipi
 Sonya Balsara as Young Feiga
 Tim Haber as Nazi Soldier
 David Aaron Baker as Davis Rathbone
 Charlotte Ubben as Mrs. Holcomb
 Chris LaPanta as Claude
 Stephen Bogardus as Phil's Father
 Lucy Walters as Mrs. Ramsay

Reception
On Rotten Tomatoes the film has  rating based on reviews from  critics, with an average rating of 4.6 from 10. Metacritic gives it a weighted average score of 45 out of 100 based on reviews from 5 critics, indicating "mixed or average reviews".

Dennis Harvey of Variety called the film a "conceptually muddled mix of quasi-horror" and concluded that it is "too slowly paced to deliver much excitement, let alone scares, while its respectable packaging elements are too conservative to provide enough atmosphere."

John DeFore of The Hollywood Reporter laments that "Yakin's script wants to deal with some big issues" but "looking cool isn't quite enough to drive the action home."

Nick Allen of RogerEbert.com gave it 1½ stars, writing, "Yakin's film offers little clarity with all of its hammy, left-field ideas, in spite of their originality when packaged as a horror movie." He also opined that the acting by the young cast "is nothing to write home about".

Noel Murray of the Los Angeles Times complimented the ornate sets and Yakin's skills in generating atmosphere and tension. He concluded: " ...this is more a surreal, nightmarish and occasionally sexually explicit trip into an adolescent’s psyche than a spook show. Yakin uses genre packaging for an intense, personal film, which many viewers may find discomfiting — if only because it’s so hard to classify."

References

External links
 
 Boarding School on Rotten Tomatoes

2018 films
2018 horror films
2010s ghost films
American ghost films
American supernatural horror films
Cross-dressing in American films
Films about murderers
Films directed by Boaz Yakin
Films produced by Trudie Styler
Films scored by Lesley Barber
Films set in the 1990s
Films set in New York City
Films set in schools
Films with screenplays by Boaz Yakin
2010s English-language films
2010s supernatural horror films
2010s American films